The discography of AKB48 consists of 61 singles (59 major singles and 2 indie singles), 9 studio albums, and 32 stage albums (12 regular stage albums and 20 as Studio Recordings Collection). The major singles have title tracks that are sung by a selection of the AKB48 singers, some of whom are from AKB48's sister groups. Some of the singles are considered annual "election singles", that is, they contain ballots for a popularity contest to determine the line-up for the next single. Other singles have line-ups that are determined by rock-paper-scissors tournaments that are held annually. The group was created and currently produced by Yasushi Akimoto, who also writes the lyrics for all of the group's songs.

Albums

Studio albums

Theater albums

Studio Recordings Collection
On New Year's Day of 2013, AKB48 released the Studio Recordings Collection. It was planned to have the set lists of 20 performances. Eight of the albums had been previously unreleased. Each 2-disc album includes extra songs and karaoke tracks not on previous versions.

Singles

Other charted songs

DVDs

PV collections

Theater DVDs

Concert DVDs 
DefStar Records Label
 「会いたかった~柱はないぜ!~」in 日本青年館 Normal Version
 「会いたかった~柱はないぜ!~」in 日本青年館 Shuffle Version
 AKB48 春のちょっとだけ全国ツアー 〜まだまだだぜAKB48!〜 in 東京厚生年金会館(Tokyo Kōsei Nenkin Kaikan)

AKS Label
 AKB48 リクエストアワーセットリストベスト100 2008(Request Hour Setlist Best100 2008, at Shibuya-AX)
 ライブDVDは出るだろうけど、やっぱり生に限るぜ! AKB48夏祭り(Live DVD wa Derudaroukedo, Yappari Nama ni Kakgiruze! AKB48 Natsumatsuri "Live DVD Will Come Out, But There is Still Best Live! AKB48 Summer Festival", at Hibiya Open-Air Concert Hall)
 AKB48 まさか、このコンサートの音源は流出しないよね?(Masaka, Kono Concert no Ongen wa Ryusyutsu Shinaiyone? "Surely Flow Out of the Sound Source of Concert?", at NHK Hall)
 年忘れ感謝祭 シャッフルするぜ、AKB! SKEもよろしくね(Toshiwasure Kansyasai Reshuffle Suruze, AKB! SKE mo Yoroshikune "Year-end Thanksgiving Will Reshuffle AKB! Please Treats SKE to", at JCB Hall)
 AKB48 リクエストアワーセットリストベスト100 2009(Request Hour Setlist Best100 2009, at Shibuya-AX)
「神公演予定」* 諸般の事情により、神公演にならない場合もありますので、ご了承ください。
 AKB48 分身の術ツアー/AKB104選抜メンバー組閣祭り
 AKB48 分身の術ツアー
 AKB104選抜メンバー組閣祭り (Senbatsu Member Sokaku Matsuri "Allstars Government Festival" Full Version)
 AKB104選抜メンバー組閣祭り("Allstars Government Festival" 3rd Stage Version, at Nippon Budokan)
 AKB48 リクエストアワーセットリストベスト100 2010(Request Hour Setlist Best100 2010, at Shibuya-AX)
 AKB48 満席祭り希望 賛否両論(Manseki Matsuri Kibou Sanpiryouron "Hope Full House Festival The Pros and Cons", at Yokohama Arena)
 AKB48 サプライズはありません(Surprise wa Arimasen "There is no surprise", at Yoyogi National Gymnasium)
 AKB48がやって来た!!(AKB48 ga Yattekita!! "Cames AKB48!!")
 AKB48 リクエストアワーセットリストベスト100 2011(Request Hour Setlist Best100 2011, at Shibuya-AX)
 AKB48 よっしゃぁ～行くぞぉ～!in西武ドーム(Yossha-ikuzo- in Seibu Dome)
 AKBがいっぱい～SUMMER TOUR 2011～(AKB ga ippai-SUMMER TOUR 2011– "Full of AKB")
 AKB48 in a-nation 2011
 AKB48 紅白歌対抗合戦 2011 (AKB48 Kouhaku Taikou Utagassen 2011 "AKB48 Red and White Songs Battle 2011", at Tokyo Dome City Hall
 AKB48 リクエストアワーセットリストベスト100 2012 (AKB48 Request Hour Setlist Best 100 2012 at Tokyo Dome City Hall)
 日本語タイトル: 前田敦子 涙の卒業宣言! in さいたまスーパーアリーナ 〜業務連絡。頼むぞ、片山部長!〜 スペシャルBOX (Maeda Atsuko Namida no Sotsugyou Sengen! in Saitama Super Arena – Gyomu Renraku. Tanomuzo, Katayama Bucho! – Special Box, "Business Contract. I'll Ask, Katayama Director! in Saitama Super Arena")
 AKB48全国ツアー2012 野中美郷、動く。～47都道府県で会いましょう～TeamK沖縄公演 (AKB48 Zenkoku Tour 2012 Nonaka Misato, Ugoku. -47 Todoufuken de Aimashou- Team K Okinawa Kouen, "AKB48 Whole Country Tour 2012. Nonaka Misato, I Move. ～See you in 47 Prefectures～ Team K Okinawa Performance")
 AKB48 in TOKYO DOME ～1830mの夢～ (AKB48 in TOKYO DOME ~1830m no Yume~,"AKB48 in TOKYO DOME ~The 1830m Dream" at Tokyo Dome) – Sales: TBA (DVD), 51,112(Blu-ray)
 AKB48 紅白歌対抗合戦 2012 (AKB48 Kouhaku Taikou Utagassen 2012 "AKB48 Red and White Songs Battle 2012", at Tokyo Dome City Hall) – Sales: 34,469(DVD), 16,630(Blu-ray)
 AKB48 リクエストアワーセットリストベスト100 2013 (AKB48 Request Hour Setlist Best 100 2013 at Tokyo Dome City Hall) – Sales: 22,002(DVD), TBA(Blu-ray)

Bibliography

Manga 
 AKB49: Renai Kinshi Jourei (AKB49 ~恋愛禁止条例~)
 AKB48 Satsujin Jiken  (AKB48殺人事件)
 AKB0048 Episode 0

Documentaries

 Documentary of AKB48 To Be Continued: 10nen go, Shōjotachi wa Ima no Jibun ni Nani o Omou Nodarō?  (2011) 
 Documentary of AKB48 Show Must Go On: Shōjotachi wa Kizutsuki Nagara, Yume o Miru  (2012) 
 Documentary of AKB48 No Flower Without Rain: Shōjotachi wa Namida no Ato ni Nani o Miru?  (2013)
 Documentary of AKB48 The Time Has Come: Shōjotachi wa, Ima, Sono Senaka ni Nani o Omou?  (2014)
 Raison D'etre: Documentary of AKB48  (2016)

Notes

References

Discography
Pop music group discographies
Discographies of Japanese artists